Eenhoorn is a surname. Notable people with the surname include:

 Bas Eenhoorn (born 1946), Dutch politician
 Paul Eenhoorn (1948–2022), Australian actor
 Robert Eenhoorn (born 1968), Dutch baseball player and sports administrator

See also 
 Einhorn (surname), German for unicorn
 Unicorn (disambiguation)

Dutch-language surnames